Lourdes Verónica Arévalos Elias (born January 13, 1984, in San Lorenzo) is a Paraguayan model and beauty pageant titleholder who represented her country in Miss Universe 2006 held in Los Angeles, California, USA on July 23, 2006. She was third runner-up. In the same, year she represented Paraguay in the Reina Sudamericana 2006 beauty pageant and was second runner-up.

References

Miss Universe 2006 contestants
Paraguayan female models
1984 births
Living people
Paraguayan beauty pageant winners
People from San Lorenzo, Paraguay